São Patrício is a municipality in the northwestern portion of the Brazilian  state of Goiás.

Location
São Patrício is located 42 km. west of Ceres.  Highway connections from Goiânia:  GO-070 / Goianira / Inhumas / GO-154 / Itaguaru / Uruana / Carmo do Rio Verde / GO-460.  See Seplan

Neighboring municipalities are  Morro Agudo de Goiás, Rubiataba, Carmo do Rio Verde, Itapuranga

Demographics
Population Density: 15.25/km² (2007)
Urban population:  980
Population growth rate: 1.60% 2000/2007

The economy
The economy is based on subsistence agriculture, cattle raising (19,000 head in 2006), services, public administration, and small transformation industries.  There was one dairy in 2007.  There were 260 farms in 2006 with 12,385 hectares of cropland and pasture.  
The main crops were rice (250 hectares), sugarcane (2,000 hectares), beans, manioc, passion fruit, corn (600 hectares), and tomatoes.

Health and education
There were 03 schools with 588 students (2006).  The adult literacy rate was 84.0% (2000) (national average was 86.4%).  In the health sector there were no hospitals.  The infant mortality rate was 22.85 (2000) (national average was 33.0).  The Municipal Human Development Index score was 0.728. For the complete list see frigoletto.com.br

Temperatures
→ Winter temperatures: low: 14 °C/high: 32 °C;

→ Spring temperatures: low: 23 °C/high: 36 °C;

→ Summer temperatures: low: 22 °C/high: 29 °C;

→ Autumn temperatures: low: 17 °C/high: 29 °C.

See also 
List of municipalities in Goiás

References

Frigoletto
 Sepin

Municipalities in Goiás